Kaydyacha Bola is a 2005 Indian Marathi-language comedy courtroom drama film directed by Chandrakant Kulkarni and produced by Uday Tamhankar. The film stars an ensemble cast of Makarand Anaspure, Sharvari Jamenis, Sachin Khedekar, Mohan Agashe, Nirmiti Sawant, Umesh Kamat, Akshay Pendse, Pushkar Shrotri and Sanjay Mone. The plot focuses on an inexperienced lawyer stepping in to defend nephew and his friend who are accused of murder. The film is a remake of Jonathan Lynn's My Cousin Vinny (1992).

Plot 
Two close friends named Abhijeet Vaidya (Umesh Kamat) and Harshavardhan Ghodke (Akshay Pendse), who are engineering college students, lie to their respective parents and plan to go for a trip to Mumbai from Harshavardhan's relatives' red-coloured Scorpio car registered with the number - "3417". After they reach their destination the next morning, the duo halt at a petrol pump in Chembur situated on the Mumbai-Pune Highway. While there, Abhijeet and Harshavardhan get their car tyres filled with air by a mechanic named Prabhudeva a.k.a. Tambi (Samir Choughule), and also jokingly converse with a dance artist named Saraswatibai Jagaonkar (Nirmiti Sawant) whose dance troupe has halted at the petrol pump as well for their bus repair work. 

While Harshavardhan is getting petrol filled in their car by the petrol pump employee named Pandurang Kute, Abhijeet decides to go to buy snacks from a store located in the vicinity. The irritated store owner named Sawant (Girish Joshi) is woken up from his sleep by Abhijeet, who manages to persuade him to let him buy snacks from the store. While buying snacks, Abhijeet quickly shoplifts a music CD to teach Sawant a lesson for his rude behaviour. The duo depart the petrol pump. 

Soon after, Abhijeet and Harshavardhan are apprehended by the Mumbai police at a nearby checkpoint for unknown reasons. They initially believe that they have been arrested for shoplifting the CD from Sawant's store and confess their crime before the police. After being taken to the police station, the duo are shocked to learn that they have been accused of robbing Pandurang Kute and stabbing him fatally with a gupti (a weapon which looks like a swordstick) inside the petrol pump premises. 

Being lost in a strange city with no contacts, Abhijeet helplessly contacts his ingenuous mother named Shaku (Amita Khopkar) from the police station in his village to explain their position and asks her to somehow free them from this matter. Shaku informs Abhijeet that his uncle named Advocate Keshav Kunthalgirikar (Makarand Anaspure) is an inexperienced but dubiously credentialed lawyer in their family. Keshav, who has been communicated by Shaku, arrives in Mumbai and visits Abhijeet and Harshavardhan in prison, advising them to be truthful about their involvement in the murder. 

Being totally new to the practice of law, Keshav embarrasses himself before the prosecution counsel named Advocate Phadnavis (Sachin Khedekar) and the judge named Prabhune (Mohan Agashe) in the first hearing of the trial. Due to his disrespect and failure to follow court etiquette, Prabhune punishes him for contempt of court and sentences Keshav to imprisonment for two days. In prison, Keshav meets a serial gambler named Bhai (Sanjay Mone) and his gang who make fun of him and bully him.

However, Keshav's girlfriend named Neha (Sharvari Jamenis) comes to visit him in Mumbai and bails him out. In the next hearing, Keshav argues that the only evidence against Abhijeet and Harshavardhan is circumstantial, which Phadnavis counters by arguing that the available evidence is strong enough to convict them. Later, it is shown that Harshavardhan's father named Suryakant Ghodke (Arun Nalawade), who is a renowned politician, learns about the duo's arrest and decides to arrange for a more experienced lawyer rather than the novice Keshav.

A public defender named Advocate G.B. Godbole (Pushkar Shrotri) is arranged by Suryakant, but he stutters and stammers constantly and has great difficulty in forming cohesive sentences, leading to a lot of amusement in the court. Suryakant is, however, tremendously impressed with the novice Keshav's advocacy skills and decides to retain him, thus firing Godbole. In the following hearing, the prosecution examines Saraswatibai and Tambi as they both were witnesses at the petrol pump where the murder took place. 

Nevertheless, Keshav's cross-examination with Tambi and Saraswatibai establishes that the possibility of another red-coloured Scorpio car being present at the petrol pump during the time of the murder cannot be ruled out, thus creating reasonable doubt. Further, the prosecution examines Sawant who is still irritated about the fact that Abhijeet disturbed his sleep and vociferously states that the murderer could have not been anyone else but the accused Abhijeet and Harshavardhan. 

However, Keshav cross-examines Sawant and comes to a conclusion that his attention was diverted from the petrol pump around the time of the murder, and thus he cannot deny another red-coloured Scorpio car having switched places with the one of Abhijeet and Harshavardhan. In the next hearing, the prosecution examines the investigating officer named Inspector P.J. Ambildhake (Ganesh Yadav), where Keshav even discusses the probability of the police manipulating evidence to trap Abhijeet and Harshavardhan, which further weakens the prosecution case. 

At the end of the hearing, Phadnavis, seemingly impressed with the novice Keshav's advocacy skills, invites him to his farmhouse for a drink that night. During their meeting, Phadnavis carefully teases Keshav around his law school days, his graduation, and his initial days as a lawyer, which Keshav hesitantly answers. He then gets into a debate with Phadnavis about how law and advocacy is more important than just earning money and manipulating the legal system to win cases. This irks Phadnavis who has a record of not losing a single case and angrily orders Keshav to leave, swearing that he will destroy his case in the next hearing.

In the final hearing, Keshav concludes his arguments and has seemingly succeeded in convincing Prabhune of Abhijeet and Harshavardhan's innocence. However, Phadnavis twists the tale and asks for permission from Prabhune to examine "Keshav" as a witness, much to everyone's puzzlement. Phadnavis asks Keshav under oath about his shaky professional history and eventually, it is revealed that Keshav never passed the bar or obtained a license to practice law. On this ground, Phadnavis applies for a re-trial of the case before Prabhune with a qualified lawyer to represent Abhijeet and Harshavardhan.

Keshav admits his mistake before Prabhune. He then goes on to make an emotional speech about how the law was meant to uphold justice and serve the needy and instead, laments that it has become a tool for people like Phadnavis to exploit technical loopholes in the procedure to strongarm cases in their favour, at the expense of the poor and needy who end up with nothing in their hands. As regards the case, Keshav creates more reasonable doubt by explaining that the angle of the wounds found on Pandurang Kute's body strongly indicates that the murderer should have been a left-hander and points out that both Abhijeet and Harshavardhan are right-handers.

Acting upon Saraswatibai's information, the police find out after some investigation that some criminals with a red-coloured Scorpio car in Pune were arrested for a bank robbery few days ago, and that they are presumably related to Pandurang Kute's murder as well. Prabhune, on the basis of reasonable doubt, announces a verdict of not guilty to Abhijeet and Harshavardhan, much to the relief of them and Keshav. However, given that Keshav has committed a crime by practicing law without a license, Prabhune orders a trial against him for cheating and contempt of court.

In the end, Abhijeet and Harshavardhan profusely thank Keshav and apologise to him for what everything cost him. Before his arrest, Keshav promises Neha that he will be hers forever after his release from prison. The film ends with everyone celebrating Keshav's victory as he is taken to the police station from a decorated police van.

Cast 
 Makarand Anaspure as Advocate Keshav Kunthalgirikar
 Sharvari Jamenis as Neha
 Sachin Khedekar as Advocate Phadnavis (prosecution counsel) 
 Mohan Agashe as Judge Prabhune
 Nirmiti Sawant as Saraswatibai Jagaonkar (dance artist) 
 Umesh Kamat as Abhijeet Vaidya
 Akshay Pendse as Harshavardhan Ghodke
 Arun Nalawade as Suryakant Ghodke (Harshavardhan's father) 
 Pushkar Shrotri as Advocate G.B. Godbole (public defender)
 Sanjay Mone as Bhai (serial gambler) 
 Samir Choughule as Prabhudeva a.k.a. Tambi (mechanic)
 Amita Khopkar as Shaku Vaidya (Abhijeet's mother) 
 Girish Joshi as Sawant (store owner)
 Ganesh Yadav as Inspector P.J. Ambildhake (investigating officer)

Soundtrack
The music is provided by Tyagraj Khadilkar.

References

External links 
 
  Movie Review - mouthshut.com
 Movie Review - tv.burrp.com
 Dr Uday Tamhankar's Blog

2005 films
2000s Marathi-language films
Films directed by Chandrakant Kulkarni
Indian comedy films
Indian remakes of American films
Indian courtroom films